Shahrak-e Mahdiyeh (also Romanized as Shahrak-e Mahdīyeh) is a village in Kenareh Rural District, in the Central District of Marvdasht County, Fars Province, Iran. At the 2006 census, its population was 2,132, in 526 families.

References 

Populated places in Marvdasht County